Wesley Moodie and Todd Perry were the defending champions, but Moodie chose not to participate, and only Perry competed that year.
Perry partnered with Jordan Kerr, but lost in the first round to Chris Guccione and Robert Smeets.

Martin Garcia and Marcelo Melo won in the final 6–3, 3–6, [10–7], against Chris Guccione and Robert Smeets.

Seeds

Draw

Draw

External links
Draw

Doubles